Sheriddin Zoirovich Boboev,, a Tajikistani professional footballer who plays for Persian Gulf Pro League club Sanat Naft Abadan and the Tajikistan national team.

Career

Club
In February 2017, Boboev joined Barkchi on loan for the 2017 season.

On 14 December 2020, Istiklol announced that Boboev would continue his career with Malaysia Super League club Penang FC.

On 2 March, Maktaaral announced the signing of Boboev. Boboev left Maktaaral on 14 July 2022.

International
Boboev made his debut for Tajikistan on 10 October 2017 against Nepal.

Career statistics

Club

International

Statistics accurate as of match played 1 June 2022

International goals
Scores and results list Tajikistan's goal tally first.

Honours

Club
 Istiklol
 Tajik League (4): 2017, 2018 2019, 2020
 Tajik Cup (2):2018, 2019
 Tajik Supercup (2): 2018, 2020

Personal life
Sheriddin Boboev is the first player in the Kazakhstan Premier League to have NFT. Boboev's official NFT was released in April 2022.

References

External links 
 Sheriddin Boboev on Instagram

1999 births
Living people
Tajikistani footballers
Tajikistan international footballers
FC Istiklol players
Association football forwards
Tajikistan Higher League players
Kazakhstan Premier League players
Expatriate footballers in Kazakhstan